Sarmaran (also Romanized as Sārmarān, Sarmārān, and Sār Merān; also known as Chahār Mārān and Chārmārān) is a village in Daman Kuh Rural District, in the Central District of Esfarayen County, North Khorasan Province, Iran. At the 2006 census, its population was 1,417, in 315 families.

References 

Populated places in Esfarayen County